Michael Alphonsus "Al" Finucane (born 8 January 1943) was an Irish football player. During his 28-year career he played for League of Ireland sides Limerick, Waterford United and Newcastlewest. Finucane was also a member of several Republic of Ireland national football team squads.

Finucane played his first game for Limerick as a 17-year-old in 1961. Finucane played in Europe for Limerick against CSKA Sofia in 1965 and 21 years later for Waterford against Bordeaux. He is the oldest player who ever played in any European club competition beating Dino Zoff's previous record. In September 1986, when he appeared against Girondins de Bordeaux in the European Cup-Winners' Cup, he was 43 years and 261 days old. Also, despite playing in so many games, Finucane was never sent off and only received 3 yellow cards. He won 3 FAI Cup winners medals; in 1971 and 1982 with Limerick and 1980 with Waterford. He also hold the record for the most League of Ireland appearances.

By the mid-1960s offers from cross-Channel clubs were pouring in. Everton came over to see the Limerick half-back in action in Milltown, Jock Stein arrived from Glasgow Celtic and there were scouting missions from Swindon Town and Millwall. Serious offers followed but after talks between the player and his Limerick manager, the decision was made to remain in Limerick.

He has the distinction of scoring the first ever goal in a competitive game at Flower Lodge.

Finucane won 11 caps for Ireland and captained the team away to Austria in 1971 . He played in the first ever Republic of Ireland U23 game in 1966 and played in un-capped internationals against West Germany's Olympic team and Australia.

Finucane scored against Hibernians F.C. in the 1980–81 European Cup Winners' Cup.

In January 1985 Finucane won his first Player of the Month award.

He retired in April 1988.

His nephew, Paul Finucane, played for Limerick F.C. and his younger brother Tony played as a goalkeeper for Waterford United in the 1970s.

He is known for his love of sunbathing.

Honours

Club
  FAI Cup: 3
 Limerick F.C. 1971, 1982
 Waterford United 1980
  FAI League Cup
 Waterford United 1973–74
  Dublin City Cup
 Limerick F.C. 1969–70

Individual
 SWAI Personality of the Year
 Limerick F.C. - 1966–67
 FAI Football Legend
  2007

References

External links
Al Finucane file at Limerick City Library, Ireland

1943 births
Living people
Sportspeople from Limerick (city)
Republic of Ireland association footballers
Republic of Ireland international footballers
Republic of Ireland under-23 international footballers
Association football defenders
League of Ireland players
Limerick F.C. players
Waterford F.C. players
League of Ireland XI players
Association footballers from County Limerick